Jesse Schaeffer (1882 – death date unknown) was an American Negro league outfielder between 1906 and 1911.

A native of Illinois, Schaeffer made his Negro leagues debut in 1906 with the Leland Giants. He went on to play with the Minneapolis Keystones in 1908 and 1909, then finished his career in 1911 with the Leland club and the Chicago Giants.

References

External links
 and Seamheads

1882 births
Date of birth missing
Year of death missing
Place of birth missing
Place of death missing
Chicago Giants players
Leland Giants players
Minneapolis Keystones players
Baseball outfielders
Baseball players from Illinois